A process automation or automation system (PAS) is used to automatically control a process such as chemical, oil refineries, paper and pulp factories.
The PAS often uses a network to interconnect sensors, controllers, operator terminals and actuators. 
A PAS is often based on open standards in contrast to a DCS (distributed control system), which is traditionally proprietary. 
However in recent times the PAS is considered to be more associated with SCADA systems.

PAS is the lowest level of automation, while MES (manufacturing execution system) is considered to be directly positioned above a PAS.

Process automation involves using sensors, actuators, computer technology and software engineering to help power plants and factories in industries as diverse as paper, mining and cement operate more efficiently and safely.

The background and technology 
In the absence of process automation, plant operators have to physically monitor performance values and the quality of outputs to determine the best settings on which to run the production equipment. Maintenance is carried out at set intervals. This generally results in operational inefficiency and unsafe operating conditions.

Process automation simplifies this with the help of sensors at thousands of spots around the plant that collect data on temperatures, pressures, flows and so on. The information is stored and analyzed on a computer and the entire plant and each piece of production equipment can be monitored on a large screen in a control room.

Plant operating settings are then automatically adjusted to achieve the optimum production. Plant operators can manually override the process automation systems when necessary.

Process automation and energy efficiency 
Factory owners want their equipment to deliver the highest output with as little production cost as possible. In many industries including oil, gas and petrochemicals, energy costs can represent 30 to 50 percent of the total production cost.

In process automation, the computer program uses measurements to show not only how the plant is working but to simulate different operating modes and find the optimal strategy for the plant. A unique characteristic of this software is its ability to "learn" and predict trends, helping speed up the response time to changing conditions.

The software and controls regulate equipment to run at the optimum speed that requires the least energy. They also ensure the consistency of quality, meaning less energy is wasted producing products that turn out to be defective, and they forecast when maintenance is needed so less time and energy is spent stopping and restarting equipment for routine inspections.

Major blocks of PAS are: microprocessors, micro controllers and micro computers, multiprocessors, LANs, SCADA, RTUs (remote terminal units) and analog and digital I/O modules

Industrial automation